Number 216 Squadron is a squadron of the Royal Air Force based at RAF Waddington, Lincolnshire, since reforming on 1 April 2020 and is tasked with testing future drone swarm technology. It had previously operated Lockheed TriStar K1, KC1 and C2s from RAF Brize Norton, Oxfordshire, between November 1984 and March 2014.

History

First World War
No. 216 Squadron's beginnings can be traced back to August 1917 when No. 7 Squadron of the Royal Naval Air Service (RNAS) sent a detachment of four Handley Page O/100 to Redcar in order to fly anti-submarine missions. Moving to Manston in October, the unit was re-designated as 'A' Squadron. At the end of October, 'A' Squadron was deployed to Ochey, France, joining No. 41 Wing as a strategic night bomber squadron. On 8 January 1918, 'A' Squadron was re-designated as No. 16 Squadron (RNAS). In March, the squadron began to convert to the Handley Page O/400. On the night of 24/25 March, an aircraft from the squadron carried out an 8 and a half hour attack on Cologne. On 1 April, while operating out of Villeseneux (south east of Reims), No. 16 Squadron (RNAS) became No. 216 Squadron of the Royal Air Force.

Interwar
Between the two World Wars the squadron used Vickers Vimy, Vickers Victoria and Vickers Type 264 Valentia aircraft on transport duties around the Middle East. No. 216 Squadron had their squadron badge approved by King Edward VIII in May 1936.

Second World War
During the Second World War, with a few exceptions, such as the attacks from 17 to 21 June 1940 by a single aircraft of No. 216 Squadron on the airfields of El Adem and Tobruk, the unit was principally a transport squadron, operating the Vickers Type 264 Valentia, Bristol Bombay, de Havilland DH86, Lockheed Hudson and Douglas Dakota. It spent a lengthy time deployed to Cairo from November 1942 to July 1945.

Post-War

In late 1949, the Dakotas were replaced by Vickers Valettas transport aircraft; in 1955 the squadron moved to RAF Lyneham from RAF Fayid in Egypt to operate the De Havilland Comet C.2 jet airliner until 27 June 1975, when No. 216 Squadron disbanded after 58 years of service.

The squadron reformed at RAF Honington on 1 July 1979 as a maritime strike squadron assigned to Supreme Allied Commander Atlantic (SACLANT) with twelve Blackburn Buccaneer S.2 aircraft transferred from the Fleet Air Arm's 809 Naval Air Squadron. These aircraft had been embarked on  until flying off for the last time in November 1978 for a delivery flight from the carrier in the Mediterranean to RAF St Athan. Designated Buccaneer S2A by the RAF, they were equipped with twelve WE.177A nuclear bombs, free-falling conventional HE bombs and Martel missiles for non-nuclear strike. However, on 7 February 1980, a No. XV Squadron Buccaneer crashed after a wing failed in flight during the Red Flag exercise in the USA. The resulting grounding and inspections saw the size of the Buccaneer fleet reduced, with the result that No. 216 Squadron had its assets merged with No. 12 (Bomber) Squadron barely a year after its reformation, however the squadron was not officially disbanded.

Lockheed TriStar (1984–2014)

Following the Falklands War, the RAF found itself lacking in the strategic transport capabilities required to sustain the expanded military presence there; this shortfall was filled initially by chartered British Airways Boeing 747s and Britannia Airways Boeing 767s. To address this, in December 1982 the RAF purchased six former British Airways Lockheed TriStar 500s. The first TriStar (ZD949) was leased back to British Airways on 29 March 1983 until November, eventually undergoing conversion at Cambridge Airport by Marshall Aerospace in 1986. In 1984, the RAF purchased a further three TriStar 500s from Pan-Am. 

No. 216 Squadron was reactivated on 1 November 1984 at RAF Brize Norton to operate the Lockheed TriStar. The aircraft were operated initially in the air-transport role but the fleet's role was eventually expanded to Air-to-Air Refuelling. On 24 March 1986, TriStar KC.1 ZD953 became the first aircraft to be handed over to the squadron. 

No. 216 Squadron deployed the TriStar fleet in support of many high-profile missions including the Gulf War (for which the aircraft received a desert paint scheme), Operation Allied Force (Kosovo), Operation Veritas and Operation Herrick (Afghanistan), Operation Telic (Iraq 2003) and Operation Ellamy (Libya).

The squadron was disbanded on 20 March 2014 at RAF Brize Norton, with the last Tristar sortie being flown on 24 March. On 11 October 2017, it was announced that Her Majesty Queen Elizabeth II had approved the award of 'Iraq 2003-2011' and 'Libya 2011' Battle Honours to No. 216 Squadron (without the right to emblazon).

Drone Swarm (2020–present)
On 17 July 2019, at the Air & Space Power Conference, the RAF announced that No. 216 Squadron would reform to become an experimental unit that will test future drone swarm technology. The squadron is expected to reform on 1 April 2020, initially based at RAF Waddington in Lincolnshire. No. 216 Squadron formally stood up on 1 April 2020.

Aircraft operated

Aircraft operated include:

 Handley Page Type O/100 (Oct 1917–1918)
 Handley Page Type O/400 (Mar 1918–Oct 1921)
 Airco DH.10 Amiens (Aug 1920–Oct 1922)
 Vickers Vimy (June 1922–Oct 1926)
 Vickers Victora Mk.II (Dec 1925–Oct 1926)
 Vickers Victoria Mk.III (July 1926–Apr 1935)
 Vickers Victoria Mk.V (Feb 1929–Aug 1934)
 Vickers Victoria Mk.IV (Apr 1929–Apr 1931)
 Vickers Victoria Mk.VI (Apr 1933–Nov 1935)
 Vickers Valentia (Feb 1935–Sep 1941)
 Bristol Bombay Mk.I (Oct 1939–May 1943)
 de Havilland DH86B (Nov 1941–Apr 1942)
 Lockheed Hudson Mk.VI (July 1942–Apr 1943)
 Douglas Dakota (Apr 1943–Dec 1949)
 Vickers Valetta C.1 (Nov 1949–Nov 1955)
 de Havilland Comet C.2 (June 1956–May 1967)
 de Havilland Comet C.4 (Feb 1962–June 1975)
 Blackburn Buccaneer S.2B (July 1979–Aug 1980)
 Hawker Hunter T.7 (1979–1980)
 Lockheed TriStar C.1 (Nov 1984–Sep 1988)
 Lockheed TriStar C.2 (Feb 1985–Mar 2014)
 Lockheed TriStar C.2A (Mar 1985–Aug 2013)
 Lockheed TriStar K.1 (Mar 1986–Mar 2014)
 Lockheed TriStar KC.1 (Feb 1989–Mar 2014)

See also
List of Royal Air Force aircraft squadrons

References

Citations

Bibliography
 

E.D Harding 1923. A history of Number 16 Squadron Royal Naval Air Service - Revised 2006 Peter Chapman

External links

Squadron History on RAF Official Website (Archived)
216 Squadron Association

216 Squadron
Military units and formations in Mandatory Palestine in World War II
R